John Erskine Read,  (July 5, 1888 – December 23, 1973) was a Canadian lawyer, civil servant, and the only Canadian judge elected to the International Court of Justice.

Education
Born in Halifax, Nova Scotia, Read graduated from the Dalhousie Law School in 1909. He completed post-graduate studies at Columbia University before receiving a Rhodes Scholarship. He received a Bachelor of Arts degree and a Bachelor of Civil Law degree from University College, Oxford. In 1913, he was called to the Nova Scotia bar and practiced law with the firm of Harris, Henry, Rogers, and Harris. During World War I, he served with the Canadian Field Artillery where he was wounded and achieved the rank of Major.

Profession
After the war, in 1920, he joined the Faculty of Law at Dalhousie University. From 1924 to 1929, he was the Dean of the faculty. In 1929, he was appointed Legal Advisor of the Department of External Affairs and rose to become a Deputy Undersecretary of State. While Legal Advisor, he was heavily involved with the Trail Smelter dispute. In 1946, he was elected a member of the International Court of Justice. He was re-appointed for a second term and served until 1958. Returning to Canada, he taught in the Faculty of Law of the University of Ottawa.

Honours
In 1967, he was made an Officer of the Order of Canada "for his services in the profession of law". In 1968, he was awarded an honorary degree from the University of Alberta. He was the first recipient of the Canadian Council on International Law John E. Read Medal.

References

External links
 John Erskine Read at The Canadian Encyclopedia

1888 births
1973 deaths
Alumni of University College, Oxford
Canadian judges
Canadian Rhodes Scholars
Canadian university and college faculty deans
Dalhousie University alumni
Academic staff of the Dalhousie University
International Court of Justice judges
Officers of the Order of Canada
Academic staff of the University of Ottawa
20th-century Canadian judges
Canadian judges of United Nations courts and tribunals